The Venerable Canon  Herbert James Stuart CB, MA (14 February 1924 – 24 February 2019) was an eminent Anglican priest in the second half of the 20th century.

Early life 
He was born on 14 February 1924, educated at Trinity College, Dublin and ordained in 1950. After  curacies at Sligo and Rathmines he entered the RAF Chaplaincy Service, eventually becoming an Honorary Chaplain to the Queen and the service's Archdeacon (Chaplain-in-Chief)  in 1980.  He retired from military service in 1983.

He died on 24 February 2019 at the age of 95.

Notes and references

1924 births
2019 deaths
Honorary Chaplains to the Queen
Royal Air Force Chaplains-in-Chief
Companions of the Order of the Bath
People educated at Kilkenny College
Alumni of Trinity College Dublin